5 Vulpeculae is a single, white-hued star in the northern constellation of Vulpecula. It is situated amidst a random concentration of bright stars designated Collinder 399, or Brocchi's Cluster. This is a faint star that is just visible to the naked eye with an apparent visual magnitude of 5.60.

This is a young A-type main-sequence star with a stellar classification of A0 V. It is a rapidly rotating star with a projected rotational velocity of 154 km/s. The star has an estimated 2.33 times the mass of the Sun and about 2.7 times the Sun's radius. It is radiating 34 times the Sun's luminosity from its photosphere at an effective temperature of 8,940 K.

Although this finding has not been directly detected, the emission signature indicates the disk is in the form of a thin ring. The emission displays weak transient absorption features that are indicative of kilometer-sized exocomets that are undergoing evaporation as they approach the host star. These absorption features have been observed to vary on time scales of hours, days, or months.

References

External links
 

A-type main-sequence stars
Vulpecula
Durchmusterung objects
Flamsteed objects
182919
095560
7390